Live in Cuba may refer to:

Live in Cuba (Audioslave video album)
Live in Cuba, album by Jazz at Lincoln Center Orchestra and Wynton Marsalis 2015
Live in Cuba, album by Ivan Lins

See also
Made in Cuba, Rick Wakeman